The United States' Serena Williams and Venus Williams defeated the Netherlands' Kristie Boogert and Miriam Oremans in the final, 6–1, 6–1 to win the gold medal in Women's Doubles tennis at the 2000 Summer Olympics. It was the first of an eventual three gold medals at the event for the Williams sisters. In the bronze medal match, Belgium's Els Callens and Dominique Van Roost defeated Belarus' Olga Barabanschikova and Natalia Zvereva, 4–6, 6–4, 6–1.

The tournament was held in the Tennis Centre, Sydney Olympic Park in Sydney, Australia from 21 September till 28 September.

The United States' Gigi Fernández and Mary Joe Fernandez were the two-time reigning gold medalists, but Gigi Fernández retired from the sport in 1997 and Mary Joe Fernandez did not participate.

Medals

Seeds

Draw

Finals

Top half

Bottom half

References
ITF Olympic Site

2000

Women's doubles
2000 in women's tennis
Women's events at the 2000 Summer Olympics